Stanisław Jan Konturek (8 October 1931 – 8 August 2019) was a Polish physiologist and gastroenterologist, a member of the Polish Academy of Sciences and the Polish Academy of Learning, and professor of Jagiellonian University Collegium Medicum.

Honors and awards (selection) 
 Gold Cross of Merit (1974)
 Knight's Cross of Polonia Restituta (1982)
 Prize of the Foundation for Polish Science (1995)
 honoris causa degree of Medical University of Białystok (1995)
 City of Kraków Award (1997)
 honoris causa degree of Wrocław Medical University (1998)
 Officer's Cross of Polonia Restituta (2001)
 honoris causa degree of Warsaw University of Life Sciences (2008)
 honoris causa degree of Medical University of Łódź (2008)

References 
 

1931 births
2019 deaths
Polish physiologists
Polish gastroenterologists
Academic staff of Jagiellonian University
Knights of the Order of Polonia Restituta
Officers of the Order of Polonia Restituta
Members of the Polish Academy of Sciences
Members of the Polish Academy of Learning